Y Fronllwyd, also known as Carnedd y Filiast North Top, is a top of Carnedd y Filiast in Snowdonia, Wales forming part of the Glyderau. It is the northern end of the Glyder mountain range. The summit has good views of Bethesda, the Penrhyn Quarry, the Carneddau, Elidir Fawr and the Menai Strait. The summit was included on the original Nuttall's list, subsequently deleted and then re-included after detailed re-surveying.

References

External links 
 www.geograph.co.uk : photos of Carnedd y Filiast and surrounding area

Llandygai
Mountains and hills of Gwynedd
Mountains and hills of Snowdonia
Nuttalls